Abadgarh is a village in Pathankot. Pathankot  is a district in the Indian state of Punjab.

References 

Indian Govt website with Abadgarh's details

Villages in Gurdaspur district